Warrior Run may refer to:

Warrior Run, Pennsylvania
Warrior Run School District
Warrior Run Generating Station
Warrior Run Presbyterian Church
Warrior Run (West Branch Susquehanna River)